Safta may refer to:

Nicoleta Safta (born 1994), Romanian handballer
Safta Jaffery, British music producer
Scientifically Aggressive Fighting Technology of America, a martial art created by American fighter Jon Hess
South Asian Free Trade Area
South African Film and Television Awards